Skiftenes is a small village in Grimstad municipality in Agder county, Norway. The lake Syndle lies just south of the village and the lake Rore lies a short distance to the east.

References

Villages in Agder
Grimstad